Compsodrillia duplicata is a species of sea snail, a marine gastropod mollusk in the family Pseudomelatomidae, the turrids and allies.

Description
The length of the shell varies between 25 mm and 58 mm.

Distribution
This species occurs in the Pacific Ocean between Mexico and Ecuador.

References

  Proceedings of the Zoological Society of London pt. 9-11 (1841-1843)

External links
 
 
 Additions to the Panamic Province gastropod (Mollusca) literature, 1971 to 1992; The Festivus vol. 24 suppl. 1992

duplicata
Gastropods described in 1834